Nagpur orange is a variety of mandarin orange (Citrus reticulata) grown in Nagpur, Maharashtra, India.

Details
The fruit has a pockmarked exterior and sweet and juicy pulp. The Geographical Indication was applied for Nagpur orange with the registrar of GIs in India, and is effective as of April 2014.

Nagpur oranges blossom during the monsoon season and are ready to be harvested. The orange crop grows twice a year. The fruit available from September to December is Ambiya which has a slightly sour taste. It is followed by the sweeter Mrig crop in January. Normally, farmers go for either of the two varieties.

References 
  

Nagpur district
Orange cultivars
Agriculture in Maharashtra
Geographical indications in Maharashtra
Harvesting of [http://www.agreefarmers.com Ambia bahar] fruits should be completed as far as possible by first week of December and the trees should be put on water stress by withdrawing irrigation. For adequate stress spray cycocel @ 2 ml/lit of water.

• Dead wood pruning may be done after harvest of Ambia fruits which should be immediately followed by spraying of fungicide, Carbendazim @ 1 gm/litre water.